Marcos Baghdatis defeated Ivan Ljubičić 7–6(7–4), 4–6, 6–4 to win the 2007 PBZ Zagreb Indoors singles tennis tournament.

Seeds

Draw

Finals

Section 1

Section 2

External links
Main Draw
Qualifying Draw

Singles